Johan Ingvald Huseklepp (born 17 August 1949) is a former Norwegian footballer who played four seasons for SK Brann. He won the Norwegian Football Cup with Brann in 1976 and was losing finalist in 1978.

He is the father of Erik Huseklepp.

References

Norwegian footballers
SK Brann players
1949 births
Living people
Association footballers not categorized by position